Bedřich Feigl (also known as Friedrich Feigl; 6 March 1884 – 17 December 1965) was a Czech-Jewish painter, graphic designer and illustrator.

Biography
Feigl studied at the Prague Academy of Fine Arts with Vlaho Bukovac and Franz Thiele. In 1906, he travelled through Europe with Emil Filla and Antonín Procházka. In Berlin he became familiar with the art of Max Liebermann. In 1907 he attended the first exhibition in Prague Group Eight. Feigl lived for a long time in Berlin and New York. He fled Prague in 1939 and settled in London, with his wife, where he died in 1965.  His works are placed in galleries around the world.

Bibliography
Bedřich Feigl - Obrazy, kresby a grafika. Praha : Židovské muzeum v Praze, 2007. 72 s. .

References

1884 births
1965 deaths
Czech illustrators
Czech graphic designers
Academy of Fine Arts, Prague alumni
20th-century Czech painters
Czech male painters
20th-century Czech male artists
Czechoslovak emigrants to the United Kingdom